The 2008–09 season was the Queensland Roar's first season of football (soccer) in Australia's women's league, the W-League, whose home ground was Ballymore Stadium.

Players

Standings

Results

Home and away season

Round 1

Round 2

Round 3

Round 4

Round 5

Round 6

Round 7

Round 8

Round 9

Round 10

Finals Series

Semi-final

Final

Leading scorers (regular season)

Awards
Player of the Year: Lana Harch
Fair Play Award: Queensland Roar

Milestones
 First game = 4–1 home win vs. Adelaide United
 Largest win = 5–0 away win vs. Central Coast Mariners
 Largest loss = 1–0 home loss vs. Canberra United

Brisbane Roar FC (A-League Women) seasons
Queensland Roar W-League